Laversdale is a village in Cumbria, England, situated to the north of Carlisle Lake District Airport. In 1870-72 the township had a population of 428. One of its more distinctive buildings is a thatched tithe barn, now a private house. The manor of Laversdale traditionally lies within the parish and bailiwick of Irthington  in the Barony of Gilsland, and covers 3200 acres. It was held by the Earl of Carlisle until the 1980s.

A turf section of Hadrian's Wall passes through the old manor boundaries just to the south of the village. Milecastle 60 would have been placed here although its exact location is uncertain. In 1851 a Roman altar was ploughed up near the likely spot. Dedicated to Cocidius, it was erected by the Sixth Legion.

There are no shops or other amenities in Laversdale following the closure of the village pub (The Sportsman Inn). The parish church is St. Kentigern's, in Irthington.

References

Villages in Cumbria
Irthington